Farrukh Zeynalov (4 May 1942 – 13 January 2022) was an Azerbaijani politician. An independent, he served in the National Assembly from 2005 to 2010. He died on 13 January 2022, at the age of 79.

References

1942 births
2022 deaths
Azerbaijan Technical University alumni
Independent politicians in Azerbaijan
Members of the National Assembly (Azerbaijan)
Politicians from Baku